is a private junior college in Mitoyo, Kagawa, Japan. Originally established as a women's junior college in 1967, it became coeducational in 1987. In 2007 the school was selected for Good Practice, a funding program by the Ministry of Education.

External links
 Official website 

Educational institutions established in 1967
Private universities and colleges in Japan
Universities and colleges in Kagawa Prefecture
Japanese junior colleges